Gyanpeeth Degree College is an undergraduate general degree college situated at Nikashi. The college is established in the year 1993 at Nikashi of Baksa district in Assam. The college is affiliated to Gauhati University.

Departments
Commerce
 Assamese
 Bengali
 Bodo
 English
 Education
 Economics
 Political Science

References

External links

Colleges affiliated to Gauhati University
Universities and colleges in Assam
1993 establishments in Assam
Educational institutions established in 1993